Dinosaur World, earlier known as John Agar's Land of Kong and Farwell's Dinosaur Park, was a tourist attraction in Beaver, Arkansas. It was a theme park covering , which contained a hundred life-size sculptures of dinosaurs, cavemen, and other prehistoric creatures as well as the world's largest Noah's Ark Mural painted by local artist Will Johnson. The park closed in 2005. At one time it was the largest dinosaur park in the world.

The park was started in 1967 when Ola Farwell hired Emmet Sullivan to build between six and ten life-size replicas of dinosaurs, and the park opened as "Farwell's Dinosaur Park". The owner, a friend of film actor John Agar, received permission from Agar, who had appeared in the 1976 version of King Kong, to use his name in the name of the park. Many articles report that John Agar was either the owner or part owner, but he was never either one.

Sculptor Emmet Sullivan also designed the dinosaur statues in Dinosaur Park and Wall Drug in South Dakota, and the Christ of the Ozarks statue in nearby Eureka Springs, Arkansas. Two local men, A. C. McBride and Orvis Parker handled the actual construction of the dinosaurs.

Along with the nearby Beaver Dam, a few of the park's dinosaurs are featured briefly during the opening scenes of the 1969 horror movie 'It's Alive!'. The tyrannosaurus is featured in the 2005 film Elizabethtown and is shown on the film's cover.

See also 
 List of dinosaur parks
 List of defunct amusement parks

References

External links
Roadside America

2005 disestablishments in Arkansas
Buildings and structures in Carroll County, Arkansas
Dinosaur sculptures
Outdoor sculptures in Arkansas
Roadside attractions in Arkansas
Defunct amusement parks in the United States
1967 establishments in Arkansas